William Wells (1815–1880) was an English whaling master (1844 to 1867), harbour master of Hull, and advisor to explorer Benjamin Leigh Smith.

Career as a mariner

William started his career as an apprentice at the age of 12 in 1827, aboard the Abram. He completed his apprenticeship in 1835 and worked as a seaman in merchant ships and whalers until 1842. On 15 February 1852, he was admitted as a younger brother of the guild of masters and pilots of Trinity House. In December 1867, after 26 years as a whaling master, William became harbour master at Hull and advisor to explorer Benjamin Leigh Smith. He retired in 1876.

Commands
Wells' first command was for the merchant ship Ann in 1842; he went on to captain many whaling ships: Helen (1844–45), St George (1846–49), Ann (1850–1853), Truelove (1854–1860 and 1866–1867), Emma (1861–62), Diana (1863), and Narwhal (1864). He was one of the last two whaling masters sailing from Hull.

See also
 Hull Maritime Museum

References

Sea captains
1815 births
1880 deaths
Seamen from Kingston upon Hull
British people in whaling
Members of Trinity House